Coghlan Lake is a body of water located about 60 miles north of Whitehorse, Yukon Territory, Canada. The lake contains many shoals and small islands. It is in a remote and mostly uninhabited area, but it does attract seasonal attention from vacationing fishermen. The most common fish in the lake are lake trout, northern pike, Arctic grayling, burbot, and whitefish. During the winter, the lake forms part of the course for the Yukon Quest sled dog race.

References 

Lakes of Yukon